The Geba is a river of West Africa that rises in the northernmost area of Guinea in the Fouta Djallon highlands, passes through southern Senegal, and reaches the Atlantic Ocean in Guinea-Bissau.

In Senegal, the river is locally known as the Kayanga.

Its tributary the Colufe River joins the Geba at Bafatá. The estuary widens further as the river flows into the Atlantic, forming the Bissagos Islands archipelago.

The Geba River, along with the Corubal River, drains the Bafatá Plateau. It also drains the Gabú Plain, along with the Farim River (also known as the Cacheu River), and their tributaries.

References

Bibliography
Salif Diop, La côte ouest-africaine. Du Saloum (Sénégal) à la Mellacorée (Rép. de Guinée), ORSTOM, Paris, 1990, p. 380

 
Rivers of Guinea
Rivers of Guinea-Bissau
Rivers of Senegal
Bafatá
International rivers of Africa